The following is a list of characters in River City, a Scottish soap opera that began broadcasting on BBC Scotland on 24 September 2002.

Present characters

Former characters

References

Characters
River City